John Buckley (born 2 November 1939) is an Irish Roman Catholic bishop. He was Bishop of Cork and Ross from 1997 to 2019.

Biography
He was born in Inchigeela (Uibh Laoire parish) in west County Cork. He studied for the priesthood at St Patrick's College, Maynooth, and was ordained in 1965.

He taught on the staff of St. Finbarr's College, Farranferris, until he became its president in 1975. He worked for one year as parish priest of Turner's Cross Parish, Cork.

On 16 March 1984 John Paul II named Buckley an auxiliary bishop for Cork and Ross and titular bishop of Leptis Magna. He was ordained to the episcopate on 29 April 1984.

On 19 December 1997, John Paul II appointed him Bishop of Cork and Ross. He had been the diocesan administrator since the death of Bishop Michael Murphy in October 1996. Buckley was installed as Bishop of Cork and Ross at the Cathedral of St. Mary and St. Anne, Cork, on 8 February 1998.

He is an accomplished road bowler.

He sent his resignation in November 2014 upon reaching the age of 75, as required by canon law; Pope Francis accepted his resignation on 8 April 2019.

References

External links
 Catholic-Hierarchy:John Buckley

1939 births
Living people
Alumni of St Patrick's College, Maynooth
Roman Catholic bishops of Cork and Ross
Irish road bowling players